Hydroporus erythrocephalus is a species of water beetle native to the Palearctic (including Europe) and the Near East. In Europe, it is found in Austria, Belarus, Belgium, Bosnia and Herzegovina, Bulgaria, the Channel Islands, Corsica, Croatia, the Czech Republic, mainland Denmark, Estonia, the Faroe Islands, Finland, mainland France, Germany, Great Britain including the Isle of Man, Hungary, the Republic of Ireland, mainland Italy, Kaliningrad, Latvia, Lithuania, Luxembourg, Northern Ireland, mainland Norway, Poland, Russia except in the South, Slovakia, Slovenia, Sweden, Switzerland, the Netherlands, Ukraine.

References

Dytiscidae
Beetles of Europe
Beetles described in 1758
Taxa named by Carl Linnaeus